is a railway station in the Ōmori section of Ōta, Tokyo, Japan. The station is along the Keikyū Main Line.

Layout
The station has two side platforms serving two tracks. Both platforms are on the upper level and connected by stairs, escalators and elevators to the ground level where ticket office, gates and toilets are located.

History
The station opened in December 1952. The location was where  (originally San'ya Station) existed from 1906 to the unknown date during the World War II (official closure following the suspension was in 1949). Prior to the move to this location, San'ya Station was on a nearby street from 1901.

The platforms originally on the ground level were moved to the new elevated tracks on 16 May 2010 (Shinagawa-bound track) and on October 21, 2013 (Uraga-bound track).

Keikyu introduced station numbering to its stations on 21 October 2010; Ōmorimachi was assigned station number KK09.

References

Railway stations in Japan opened in 1952
Keikyū Main Line
Stations of Keikyu
Railway stations in Tokyo